Neelam Upadhyaya (born 5 October 1993) is an Indian actress who has appeared in Tamil and Telugu films.

Career
Neelam Upadhyaya got the opportunity to act in Seivathu Sariye in 2010 but the film was later delayed and subsequently shelved. Neelam Upadhyaya made a breakthrough after her portfolio for MTV's Style Check was well received and prompted filmmakers to offer her acting opportunities. Neelam Upadhyaya made her acting debut with the Telugu film, Mr. 7 (2012), which received mixed reviews and underperformed at the box office. She appeared in the first 3D Telugu film with Action 3D (2013), before appearing in two Tamil films, Unnodu Oru Naal (2013) and the ghost film, Om Shanthi Om (2015) opposite Srikanth. The former film was noted for its bold theme, while the latter had a delayed-release. Both films had low key releases and did not perform well commercially.

Filmography

References

External links

Indian film actresses
Actresses in Tamil cinema
Living people
Actresses from Gujarat
Actresses in Telugu cinema
1993 births